Puran's Well is an historic site near Sialkot in the Punjab province of Pakistan. It lies just a few kilometres from the Sialkot Cantonment on the highroad to Chaprar village.

History
Raja Salbhan was a very famous ruler at Sialkot. He reconstructed the Sialkot Fort. His first son, by his second wife, was Prince Puran. The Raja's childless first wife, scheming against Puran, falsely accused him of attempting to rape her. The Raja got so angry that he ordered his soldiers to kill Prince Puran and throw him into a well outside city. So Sálbán's soldiers cut off his hands and feet and threw him into the well. Incidentally, a spiritual teacher who lived beside the Chenab river, Guru Gorakhnath, happened by that well with his companions. While they were resting beside the well they found the injured Prince and rescued him. After the Prince had partially recovered and related his story. Guru Gorakhnath ordered the Prince to stay beside the well, built him a camp for his residence and departed to Jehlum. Prince Puran stayed there for many years and gave spiritual advice to the people of the area. When he died, his funeral took place on a mound in front of the place where he used to dwell and a beautiful small tomb was erected in his remembrance.

According to Mutiny in Sialkot there were remains of Puran's tomb extant in 1857, but now there is no tomb except for a small building, a small place for worship and a running well. This story become a very famous Punjabi folk-lore. This place is still the resort of pilgrims. Women come here to bathe in its blessed water as a cure for infertility. Religion is no bar and they come from across the spectrum of religions in Pakistan.

A Hindu temple is also located on a few steps of this Well.

See also
Sialkot
Sialkot Fort

References

External links
 Daily Times - Latest Pakistan News, World, Business, Sports, Lifestyle

Tourist attractions in Sialkot
History of Punjab
Archaeological sites in Punjab, Pakistan
Buildings and structures in Sialkot